John Ramsden (12 November 1947 – 16 October 2009) was Professor of History at Queen Mary, University of London until his retirement in 2008. He was an authority on the history of the Conservative Party.

Education
Ramsden was born in Sheffield, the son of Cyril Ramsden, who worked for the National Coal Board, and his wife Mary Ramsden. He attended King Edward VII School in 1959–1966, followed by Corpus Christi College, Oxford, where he graduated with a first in modern history.

Research and teaching
Ramsden moved to Nuffield College, Oxford to pursue doctoral research on "the organisation of the Conservative Party in Britain 1910–30", under Robert Blake and David Butler. He then joined Queen Mary College, London, as a lecturer in history in January 1972.

References

1947 births
2009 deaths
People educated at King Edward VII School, Sheffield
Alumni of Corpus Christi College, Oxford
Alumni of Nuffield College, Oxford
Academics of Queen Mary University of London
20th-century British historians